Daney is a surname. Notable people with the surname include:

Art Daney (1904–1988), American baseball player
Daniel Daney (1905–?), French boxer
George Daney (1946–1990), American football player
Serge Daney (1944–1992), French film critic

See also
Laney (surname)